Älmhult is a locality and the seat of Älmhult Municipality in Kronoberg County, Sweden with 8,955 inhabitants in 2010.

It was in Älmhult that the first IKEA (the Swedish furniture company) store was built. IKEA continues to have a large corporate presence there. A museum of IKEA's history, the IKEA Museum, opened in the town on 30 June 2016. It was constructed to present the history of IKEA. Visitors to Älmhult can also experience  the IKEA Hotel, which opened in 1964 and is situated near IKEA's offices and opposite the IKEA Museum. 

The botanist Carl Linnaeus was born in Råshult, Stenbrohult, now part of Älmhult municipality.

Älmhult has a local gymnasium called Haganässkolan, and also an International School up to Grade 10.
Haganässkolan is an International Baccalaureate authorized world school offering the IB Diploma Programme since August 2017. The school also offers a preparatory year, the Pre-Diploma Programme.

References 

Municipal seats of Kronoberg County
Swedish municipal seats
Populated places in Kronoberg County
Populated places in Älmhult Municipality
Värend

fi:Älmhultin kunta